William Alton Carter (March 29, 1937 – September 25, 1988) was an American farmer, businessman, brewer, and politician. The younger brother of U.S. President Jimmy Carter, he promoted Billy Beer and Peanut Lolita; and he was a candidate for mayor of Plains, Georgia.

Early life
William Alton Carter was the fourth and youngest child of Lillian and James Earl Carter. Billy Carter attended Emory University, served in the United States Marine Corps, and later worked in the Carter family's peanut business.

1970s and later
In 1970, Billy Carter was managing partner and 15% owner of the Carter family's peanut business. By 1976, Billy had increased revenues to $5-million per year.

In 1972, Billy Carter purchased a gas and service station in Plains. He owned and operated it for most of the decade. At its peak he sold 2,000 cases of beer a month and more than 40,000 gallons of gas. In 2009, the station became the Billy Carter Service Station Museum, via the University of Georgia.

Carter ran for mayor of Plains in 1976, but lost the election, 97 to 71 votes, to A.L. Blanton, an Albany airport air traffic controller.

In the 1970s Billy Carter was the official spokesperson for Peanut Lolita liqueur while his brother, Jimmy Carter held presidential office.

In 1977, although a Pabst Blue Ribbon drinker, he endorsed Billy Beer, introduced by the Falls City Brewing Company, who wished to capitalize upon his colorful image as a beer-drinking Southern good ol' boy that developed in the press when his brother ran for president. Billy Carter's name was occasionally used as a gag answer for a Washington, D.C., trouble-maker on 1970s episodes of Match Game. He was known for his outlandish public behavior; he once urinated on an airport runway in full view of the press and dignitaries.
 
By 1979, he drank half a gallon of vodka and whiskey a day. In February 1979, Carter was admitted to seven weeks of rehabilitation, at the Long Beach, California, Navy Hospital alcohol treatment facility, where Betty Ford went for nearly four weeks. He later became sober and reportedly extended support to other addicts in their own recovery.

Relationship with Libya
In late 1978 and early 1979, Billy Carter visited Libya three times with a contingent from Georgia. He eventually registered as a foreign agent of the Libyan government and received a $220,000 loan, The New York Times reports belief that only $1,000 was repaid. However, Edwin P. Wilson claimed he had seen a telegram showing that Libya paid Billy Carter $2 million. This led to a Senate hearing on alleged influence peddling which the press named Billygate. A Senate sub-committee was called To Investigate Activities of Individuals Representing Interests of Foreign Governments (Billy Carter—Libya Investigation).

Home sales
In 1981 he was forced to sell his Plains properties, to pay taxes and debts, and moved to Haleyville, Alabama, selling for Tidwell Industries. In 1985, he became vice president of Scott Housing Systems.

After Billy died, his wife, Sybil, opened a cafe.

Death
Carter was diagnosed with pancreatic cancer in the fall of 1987 and received unsuccessful treatments for the disease. He died in Plains the following year at age 51, five years after the death of his sister Ruth Carter Stapleton, who also died of pancreatic cancer, at age 54. Their father, James Earl Carter Sr., also died of the disease at the age of 58.

In 1999, Carter's son William "Buddy" Carter IV published a biography of his father: Billy Carter: A Journey Through the Shadows.

Further reading

See also

 List of scandals with "-gate" suffix

References

External links
Carter, Billy, 1937-1988 - U.S. National Archives and Records Administration
FBI file on Billy Carter
Billy Carter's "Redneck Power Pick-up" model

1937 births
1988 deaths
United States Marines
Burials in Georgia (U.S. state)
Carter family
Deaths from pancreatic cancer
People from Plains, Georgia
Emory University alumni
Businesspeople from Georgia (U.S. state)
Deaths from cancer in Georgia (U.S. state)
Military personnel from Georgia (U.S. state)
20th-century American businesspeople